Świętajno is a village in Szczytno County, Warmian-Masurian Voivodeship, in northern Poland. It is the seat of the gmina (administrative district) called Gmina Świętajno.

The village has a population of 2,000.

References

Villages in Szczytno County